The New Media Consortium (NMC) was an international 501(c)3 not-for-profit consortium of  learning-focused organizations dedicated to the exploration and use of new media and new technologies.

History
The New Media Consortium (NMC) was founded in 1993 by a group of hardware manufacturers, software developers, and publishers who felt that the ultimate success of their multimedia-capable products depended upon their acceptance by the higher education community.

Those 22 institutions initiated a number of collaborative activities, and their working group — then called the New Media Centers — quickly evolved into an independent not-for-profit 501(c)3 corporation by early 1994, with headquarters in San Francisco. In 2002, the NMC moved its national headquarters from San Francisco, CA to Austin, TX.

In December 2017 the organization announced in an email that it was ceasing operations and filing for Chapter 7 bankruptcy. The statement blamed the closure on "apparent errors and omissions by its former Controller and Chief Financial Officer."  The involvement of the board of Directors, the Board Officers and especially the Treasurer, or the Executive Director in the events that led to the NMC's demise remained unclear in the aftermath of the dissolution.

Board of Directors
Members and officers at the time of the announcement 

 Gardner Campbell, Chair. Associate Prof. of English, Virginia Commonwealth University
 Don Henderson, Vice Chair. Senior Manager, Creative Expression, Apple Inc.
 Joan Lippincott, Treasurer. Associate Executive Director, Coalition for Networked Information
 Liz Neely, Secretary. Senior Director, Integrated Content, American Alliance of Museums (AAM)
 Michael Berman, Board Member. VP Technology & Communication, California State University, Channel Islands
 Kyle Bowen, Board Member. Director, Educational Technology, Pennsylvania State University
 Crista Copp, Board Member. Director of Educational Technology Services & Support, Loyola Marymount University
 Christina Engelbart, Board Member. Executive Director, Doug Engelbart Institute
 Cynthia Golden, Board Member. Director, University Center for Teaching & Learning, University of Pittsburgh
 Marco Torres, Board Member. Director of Story, Digital Promise

Senior Staff
As of December, 2017

 Executive Director — Eden Dahlstrom
 Senior Director, Financial Services and Controller  — Anne Treadway, CPA
 Senior Director, Communications — Samantha Becker
 Senior Director, Membership and Special Projects  — Alex Freeman
 Senior Director, CTO  — Gordon Jackson

Offices
The NMC had offices in Texas in the United States.  The final headquarters office was in Austin, Texas.

See also
New Media Council
New media art

References

External links
Official website
Video about the campus in Second Life

Organizations established in 1993
New media
International educational organizations
International organizations based in the United States